Adel Nassief (20 October 1962 – 19 March 2021) was a Coptic painter specializing in Coptic art. He has some work on display on the external wall of a Coptic church in Paris and some work in the Cairo modern art museum and in Coptic churches in Damanhour and Alexandria. He drew the illustrations in the book First Christmas by Alastair Macdonald.

He received a bachelor of fine arts, Faculty of Arts, Alexandria University Department of Painting with General Grade Very Good with high Honours 1985. He then did specialised studies in Coptic Art and Icons at the Institute of Coptic Studies, Cairo.

Nassief died on 19 March 2021, at the age of 58, after contracting COVID-19.

See also
Coptic iconography
List of prominent Copts
Icon

References

External links
First Christmas book

1962 births
2021 deaths
Egyptian Copts
Coptic painters
Alexandria University alumni
People from Beheira Governorate
Deaths from the COVID-19 pandemic in Egypt